Starline 2200 is a set of miniatures for Star Fleet Battles published by Task Force Games.

Contents
Starline 2200 is a line of miniature ships, and each blister pack contains a lead cast ship, a clear plastic stand, paint guide, and color facing chart.

Reception
Ed Andrews reviewed Starline 2200 in Space Gamer No. 66. Andrews commented that "The miniatures paint up nicely and, though they were intended for gaming, make nice collector's items. The castings are clean and flash is minimal and easily removed. Considering the quality of most castings today, Task Force is doing a fine job."

See also
List of lines of miniatures

References

Miniature figures
Star Fleet Battles